Gasterophilus haemorrhoidalis (also called nose botfly or lip botfly) is a species of the genus Gasterophilus that lays eggs on the lips and around the mouth of horses, mules and donkeys.

In Equidae, third-stage larvae attach to the stomach, but also to the rectum, sometimes in great numbers. Heavy infestation can cause anal prolapse in foals and mules.

They do not parasitise humans.

References

External links
GNWT - Environment and Natural Resources 'Nose Bot' page

Oestridae
Parasitic flies
Insects described in 1758
Taxa named by Carl Linnaeus